The Aviat Husky is a tandem two-seat, high-wing, utility light aircraft built by Aviat Aircraft of Afton, Wyoming.

It is the only all-new light aircraft that was designed and entered series production in the United States in the mid-to-late 1980s.

Development
Design work by Christen Industries began in 1985. The aircraft is one of the few in its class designed with the benefit of CAD software. The prototype first flew in 1986, and certification was awarded the following year.

With more than 650 aircraft sold between its introduction and 2008, the Husky was one of the best-selling light aircraft designs of the period.

Design

The Husky features a braced high wing, tandem seating and dual controls. The structure is steel tube frames and Dacron covering over all but the rear of the fuselage, plus metal leading edges on the wings. The high wing was selected for good all-around visibility, making the Husky ideal for observation and patrol roles.  Power is supplied by a relatively powerful (for the Husky's weight)  Textron Lycoming O-360 flat-four piston engine turning a constant speed propeller. In 2015 a reversible MT Propeller was approved under a Supplemental type certificate for better control during floatplane water operations.  The Husky's high power-to-weight ratio and low wing loading result in good short-field performance.

Options include floats, skis and banner and glider tow hooks.

Operational history
The Husky has been used for observation duties, fisheries patrol, pipeline inspection, glider towing, border patrol and other utility missions. Notable users include the US Department of the Interior and Agriculture and the Kenya Wildlife Service, which flies seven on aerial patrols of elephant herds as part of the fight against illegal ivory poaching.

Variants

The Husky comes in six versions:
Husky A-1
Certified on 1 May 1987. Powered by a Lycoming 0-360-A1P or a Lycoming O-360-C1G of 
Husky A-1A
Certified on 28 January 1998. Powered by a Lycoming 0-360-A1P of 

Certified on 28 January 1998.
Husky A-1B-160 Pup
Certified on 18 August 2003 without flaps and 21 October 2005 with flaps. Powered by a Lycoming 0-320-D2A, .
Husky A-1C-180

Certified on 24 September 2007.
Husky A-1C-200
Certified on 24 September 2007.

Specifications (A-1C Husky)

See also

References
Notes

External links

 

Husky
High-wing aircraft
Single-engined tractor aircraft
1980s United States civil utility aircraft
Glider tugs
Aircraft first flown in 1986